John Gillanders Turriff (14 December 1855 – 10 November 1930) was a Canadian parliamentarian.

Born in Petit-Métis, Canada East, Turriff as a young man settled in Western Canada, first in Manitoba, where he established himself as a farmer, and subsequently in that part of the North-West Territories which corresponds to the modern province of Manitoba. After moving to the North-West Territories, he became a successful merchant.  A Liberal, he first ran for a seat as a Member of Parliament for the electoral district of Assiniboia East in 1891, but was defeated by Conservative Edgar Dewdney. He did not run again for federal office until the Canadian federal election of 1904, when he succeeded in securing the seat for Assiniboia East. He was subsequently re-elected in 1908, 1911, and 1917.  During the later years of World War I, Turriff sat as a Liberal-Unionist and was a reluctant supporter of the Unionist coalition government led by Conservative Robert Laird Borden. In recognition of his support, Turriff was appointed on 23 September 1918 to the Senate of Canada on Borden's recommendation, and represented the senatorial division of Assiniboia, Manitoba as a Liberal until his death.

References

External links 
 
 

1855 births
1930 deaths
Members of the House of Commons of Canada from Manitoba
Liberal Party of Canada MPs
Liberal Party of Canada senators
Unionist Party (Canada) MPs
Canadian senators from Manitoba
Members of the House of Commons of Canada from the Northwest Territories
Members of the Legislative Assembly of the Northwest Territories